Events from the year 1848 in art.

Events
April 10 – John Ruskin marries Effie Gray in Perth, .
September – John Everett Millais, William Holman Hunt and Dante Gabriel Rossetti found the pre-Raphaelite Brotherhood in the former's family home in Gower Street (London).
c. October – The first frescoes of scenes from English literature in the Poets' Hall of the Palace of Westminster are completed: Charles West Cope's Griselda's first Trial of Patience and John Callcott Horsley's Satan touched by Ithuriel's Spear while whispering evil dreams to Eve. 
December 10 – The Leipzig Art Association opens the Städtische Museum.
In Cambridge, England, the Fitzwilliam Museum's Founder's Building (designed by George Basevi and completed by C. R. Cockerell) is opened.
In Copenhagen, Denmark, the Thorvaldsen Museum of sculpture (designed by Michael Gottlieb Bindesbøll) is opened.
In England, John Webb Singer establishes the Frome Art Metal Works, a foundry that becomes Morris Singer.

Works

Ivan Aivazovsky – Battle of Chesma
Herman Wilhelm Bissen – Den Danske Landsoldat
Karl Bryullov – Self-portrait
Charles West Cope – Cardinal Wolsey's Reception at Leicester Abbey
David Cox – Crossing the Sands
Thomas Crawford - Mexican Girl Dying
Edward Hicks – The Cornell Farm
Holman Hunt – The Flight of Madeline and Porphyro during the Drunkenness attending the Revelry, Eve of Saint Agnes
Jean Auguste Dominique Ingres – Baronne de Rothschild
August Kopisch – The Pontine Marshes at Sunset
Emanuel Leutze - The Storming of Teocalli by Cortez and his Troops
Jean-François Millet
The Winnower
The Captivity of the Jews in Babylon (later covered by The Young Shepherdess in 1870 due to a scarcity of materials during the Franco-Prussian War; rediscovered in 1984 by x-ray at Boston's Museum of Fine Arts)
Samuel Palmer – The Water Mill
Ferdinand Richardt
Frederiksborg Castle
Kronborg Castle
Théophile Schuler – The Chariot of Death (painting, completed in 1851)
John Evan Thomas – Death of Tewdric Mawr, King of Gwent (sculpture)
Philipp Veit – Germania

Births
January 13 – Lilla Cabot Perry, American painter (died 1933)
February 18 – Louis Comfort Tiffany, American stained glass artist (died 1933)
March 1 – Augustus Saint-Gaudens, American sculptor (died 1907)
March 14 – Lise Tréhot, French art model died 1922)
March 18 – Princess Louise, member of the British Royal Family and sculptor (died 1939)
March 22 – Sarah Purser, Irish painter and stained-glass maker (died 1943)
June 8 – Paul Gauguin, French post-Impressionist painter (died 1903)
August 10 – William Harnett, Irish American trompe l'oeil painter (died 1892)
August 19 – Gustave Caillebotte, French painter and arts patron (died 1894)
September 26 – Helen Allingham, English painter and illustrator (died 1926)
October 3 – Henry Lerolle, French painter and arts patron (died 1929)
date unknown
Giovanni Battista Amendola, Italian-born sculptor (died 1887)
Helen Thornycroft, English painter (died 1937)

Deaths
January 14 – Robert Adamson, Scottish pioneer photographer (born 1821)
February 7 – Christen Købke, Danish painter (born 1810)
February 11 – Thomas Cole, American landscape painter (born 1801)
February 29 – Louis-François, Baron Lejeune, French general, painter and lithographer (born 1775)
March 23 – Julien-Joseph Ducorron, Belgian landscape painter (born 1770)
March 29 – Martinus Rørbye,  Danish genre painter (born 1803)
May 17 – Jan Frans Eliaerts, Flemish painter of animals, flowers and fruit (born 1761)
May 30 – Antonio Basoli, Italian painter, interior designer, engraver and professor (born 1774)
June 28 – Jean-Baptiste Debret, French painter of lithographs depicting the people of Brazil (born 1768)
August 15 – Pyotr Sokolov, Russian aquarelle portraitist (born 1791)
August 20 – Keisai Eisen, Japanese ukiyo-e artist (born 1790)
November 14 – Ludwig Michael Schwanthaler, German sculptor (born 1802)
December 13 – John Ternouth, English sculptor (born 1796)

References

 
Years of the 19th century in art
1840s in art